Leucoptera strophidota is a moth in the Lyonetiidae family that is endemic to Australia.

They probably mine the leaves of their host plant.

External links
Australian Faunal Directory

Leucoptera (moth)
Moths described in 1923
Endemic fauna of Australia
Moths of Australia